The Northern Maine Medical Center is a hospital located in the town of Fort Kent, Maine. It serves most of Aroostook County, including more than ten small and medium-sized communities.

External links
 http://www.nmmc.org

Category: List of hospitals in Maine

Hospitals in Maine
Buildings and structures in Aroostook County, Maine
Fort Kent, Maine